The Dachstein Formation or Dachstein Limestone (German: Dachsteinkalk) is a geologic formation in the Alps and other Tethyan mountain ranges in Austria, Germany, Hungary, Italy, Switzerland, Slovakia and Slovenia. It preserves fossils dated to the Norian and Rhaetian stages of the Late Triassic period.

Fossil content 
Among others, the following fossils were reported from the formation:
Reptiles
 Mystriosuchus planirostris

Invertebrates

 Agathammina austroalpina
 Cnemidium vallisnerii
 Dicerocardium curionii
 D. jani
 Megalodus hoernesi
 M. laczkoi
 Involutina communis
 I. gaschei
 I. tenuis
 Nodosaria ordinata
 Rhaetina gregaria
 Semiinvoluta clari
 Triasina oberhauseri
 Trocholina acuta
 T. alpina
 T. permodiscoides
 Alpinophragmium sp.
 Involutina sp.
 Nodosaria sp.

See also 

 List of fossiliferous stratigraphic units in Austria
 List of fossiliferous stratigraphic units in Germany
 List of fossiliferous stratigraphic units in Hungary
 List of fossiliferous stratigraphic units in Italy
 List of fossiliferous stratigraphic units in Slovakia
 List of fossiliferous stratigraphic units in Slovenia
 List of fossiliferous stratigraphic units in Switzerland

References

Bibliography 
 
 
 
 

Geologic formations of Austria
Geologic formations of Germany
Geologic formations of Hungary
Geologic formations of Italy
Geologic formations of Slovakia
Geologic formations of Slovenia
Geologic formations of Switzerland
Triassic System of Europe
Triassic Austria
Triassic Germany
Triassic Italy
Triassic Switzerland
Norian Stage
Rhaetian Stage
Limestone formations
Lagoonal deposits
Shallow marine deposits
Paleontology in Austria
Paleontology in Hungary
Paleontology in Italy
Paleontology in Slovakia
Paleontology in Slovenia
Geology of the Alps
Northern Limestone Alps
Southern Limestone Alps